At the Fillmore, is the 2nd live DVD by American band Hanson. It was recorded on 27 June 2000 at The Fillmore Auditorium in San Francisco. The concert aired on DirecTV throughout the summer of 2000 and the DVD was released in Japan, United States and Canada in April 2001.

Track listing 
All songs written by Isaac Hanson, Taylor Hanson, and Zachary Hanson, except Magic Carpet Ride (Rushton Moreve, John Kay)
 "You Never Know" 
 "Runaway Run" 
 "Thinking of You" 
 "I Wish That I Was There" 
 "Sure About It" 
 "Love Song" 
 "Hand In Hand" 
 "A Song To Sing"
 "If Only"
 "This Time Around"
 "MMMBop" 
 "Magic Carpet Ride" 
 "In The City"

Charts

References 

 "Hanson - At The Fillmore". IMDb
 [ "At The Fillmore"]. Allmusic.

Hanson (band) video albums
Albums recorded at the Fillmore
2001 video albums
Live video albums
2001 live albums